Alicia Moore (born Alicia Ann [or Anne] Radford, Sheffield, England; 1790 - 1873) was a British novelist. She was the daughter of clergyman Thomas Radford (1748-1816) and Elizabeth (Gunning) Radford.

Moore was the author of Eveleen Mountjoy (1819), Rosalind and Felicia, or, The Sisters (1821) (later published as The Leycesters), and Historical Pictures of the Middle Ages (1846).

Henry Rowland Brown (1837-1921) dedicated his illustrated guide book The Beauties of Lyme Regis and Charmouth to her.

References 

1790 births
1873 deaths
19th-century British novelists
British women novelists
Writers from Sheffield
19th-century women writers